Piyush Ranade (born 28 March 1983) is a Marathi film & television actor. He appeared in Zee Marathi television's Ekach Hya Janmi Janu, Kata Rute Kunala & Asmita and Star Plus's Burey Bhi Hum Bhale Bhi Hum as Kaivalya.

Career 
Piyush Ranade's first major Hindi play was Mahanirvan by Satish Alekar when he was still in college. He later performed in Oye Band Baj Gaya!  and Sakna Re To Sasu Nahi  by National Centre for the Performing Arts (India). 
Piyush got his first Marathi television show Kata Rute Kunala. His first major Hindi television show was Burey Bhi Hum Bhale Bhi Hum on Star Plus in which he played Kaivalya (Mansukh's elder son). His first Marathi television show as lead star was Zee Marathi's Lajja along with Girija Oak, Tejaswini Pandit and Mukta Barve. In this show, he portrayed character of a young and dynamic CID Inspector Akash Ketkar who was firm supporter of a scandal victim Manu (played by Girija Oak). The show was huge hit and his work was very well praised. This was the start of his career. After that he never looked back. His second Marathi television show as lead was Zee Marathi's Ekach Hya Janmi Janu opposite to Tejaswini Pandit. In Ekach Hya Janmi Janu, he portrayed character named Shrikant, who found his lost wife's reflection in a disabled girl Anjali (played by Tejaswini Pandit. He was also seen in other Marathi, Hindi as well as Gujrati television shows. Pawan in Gunda Purush Dev on ETV Marathi, Madhu Ithe An Chandra Tithe on Zee Marathi, Man Udhan Varyache, Manu in Papad Pol, Jasuben Jayantilaal Joshi Ki Joint Family, Chalti ka naam gaadi zee TV Ek Phool Khile Che Aag Ma. ETV Gujarati and Chuta Cheda ETV Gujarati. He also played Lead Role Character of Abhimaan in Zee Marathi's Serial Asmita. He was also played role of Dr. Aseem Khanapurkar in Zee Yuva's serial Anjali.

Filmography

Television

References

External links 
 Piyush Ranade Official Webpage
 

1983 births
Living people
Male actors from Nagpur
Indian male television actors
Maharaja Sayajirao University of Baroda alumni
Marathi actors
Male actors in Marathi television
21st-century Indian male actors